For the analysis of income, Statistics Canada distinguishes between the following statistical units:
Household: "a person or group of persons who occupy the same dwelling"
Economic families: "two or more persons who live in the same dwelling and are related to each other by blood, marriage, common-law union, adoption or a foster relationship (a couple may be of opposite or same sex)"
Census families: "a married couple and the children, if any, of either and/or both spouses; a couple living common law and the children, if any, of either and/or both partners; or a lone parent of any marital status with at least one child living in the same dwelling and that child or those children (all members of a particular census family live in the same dwelling; a couple may be of opposite or same sex)"

Therefore, a person living alone constitutes a household, but not an economic or census family. Two couples sharing a dwelling constitute a single household, but two economic or census families. A couple living with its children and one spouse's parents constitutes a single household or economic family, but two census families.

Income statistics by census metropolitan area (CMA) are published:
every 5 years for households (data from the Census of Population)
annually for economic families, for select CMAs (data from the Canadian Income Survey)
annually for census families (data from the T1 Family File)

The income concept for this article is total income.

Median Household and Family Income by Census Metropolitan Area

References

Demographics of Canada
Canada economy-related lists
Canada